The 1894–95 Scottish Cup was the 22nd season of Scotland's most prestigious football knockout competition. The Cup was won by St Bernard's when they beat Renton, 2-1, in the final.

Calendar

First round

Match Declared Void

First round replay

Second round

Match Declared Void

Second round replay

Quarter-final

Quarter-final replay

Semi-finals

Match was played as a friendly due to difficult field conditions

Semi-final replay

Semi-final second replay

Final

Teams

See also
1894–95 in Scottish football

References

RSSF Scottish Cup 94-95

1894-1895
Cup
Cup